Novlyanka is a rural locality (a village) and the administrative center of Novlyanskoye Rural Settlement, Selivanovsky District, Vladimir Oblast, Russia. The population was 894 as of 2010. There are 5 streets.

Geography 
Novlyanka is located on the right bank of the Ushna River, 9 km south of Krasnaya Gorbatka (the district's administrative centre) by road. Lobanovo is the nearest rural locality.

References 

Rural localities in Selivanovsky District
Sudogodsky Uyezd